The South America section of the 2018 FIVB Volleyball Women's Challenger Cup qualification acts as qualifiers for the 2018 FIVB Volleyball Women's Challenger Cup, for national teams which are members of the Confederación Sudamericana de Voleibol (CSV). This tournament was held in Lima, Peru. The winners earned the right for a playoff against CAVB's contender.

Qualification
4 CSV national teams entered qualification.

Pool standing procedure
 Number of matches won
 Match points
 Sets ratio
 Points ratio
 Result of the last match between the tied teams

Match won 3–0 or 3–1: 3 match points for the winner, 0 match points for the loser
Match won 3–2: 2 match points for the winner, 1 match point for the loser

Round robin
Venue:  Coliseo Manuel Bonilla, Lima, Peru
All times are Peru Time (UTC-05:00).

|}

|}

References

External links
South American Volleyball Confederation – official website
CSV Continental Qualifications – official website

Women's volleyball competitions
FIVB
2018 FIVB Volleyball Women's Challenger Cup qualification